A multiple-vortex tornado is a tornado that contains several vortices (called subvortices or suction vortices) revolving around, inside of, and as part of the main vortex. The only times multiple vortices may be visible are when the tornado is first forming or when condensation and debris are balanced such that subvortices are apparent without being obscured. They can add over 100 mph to the ground-relative wind in a tornado circulation and are responsible for most cases where narrow arcs of extreme destruction lie right next to weak damage within tornado paths.

General
Suction vortices (or suction spots) are really substructures of many, perhaps all, tornadoes but are not always easily visible.  These usually occur at the base of the tornado vortex where the tornado makes contact with the surface.  Subvortices tend to form after vortex breakdown reaches the surface and are resultant from the ratio of cyclonically incoming and rising air motions. Multivortex structure is not unique to tornadoes, occurring in other circulations such as dust devils, but is a natural result of the physics of vortex dynamics.

Multivortex tornadoes should not be confused with cyclically tornadic supercells. These systems can have the tendency to produce many, and very separate tornadoes, called tornado families, existing either at the same time or in succession. A phenomenon similar in nature to multiple vortices is the satellite tornado. It is different from a multiple-vortex tornado in that it exists outside of the main tornado and forms via a different mechanism.

Notable tornadoes
The destructive May 2011 EF5 Joplin, Missouri tornado was an example of a multiple-vortex tornado.

The largest tornado ever documented was a multiple-vortex tornado. It struck El Reno, Oklahoma, on May 31, 2013, taking the lives of tornado researcher Tim Samaras, his son Paul, and their TWISTEX colleague, Carl Young. This storm also took the life of local amateur chaser Richard Henderson. Nevertheless, the El Reno tornado is one of the two strongest tornadoes ever recorded in terms of maximum wind speeds, the other being the 1999 Bridge Creek–Moore tornado which doppler radar measured  mph, later revised to 301±20 mph.

See also 

 Tornadogenesis

References

External links
 Multiple Vortex Tornado at the Online Tornado FAQ

Tornado